The Anti-Infiltration Act is a law regulating the influence of entities deemed foreign hostile forces on the political processes of the Republic of China (commonly known as Taiwan), including elections and referendums. The act was passed by the Legislative Yuan on 31 December 2019 and promulgated by the Tsai Ing-wen presidential administration on 15 January 2020.

History

President Tsai Ing-wen said in July 2016, and again in January 2017, that laws against espionage were necessary. Bills to counter espionage were proposed by the Ministry of Justice three times by February 2017, but all were rejected by a minister without portfolio. Democratic Progressive Party legislators Chen Ming-wen, and  stated that such bills should have included anti-infiltration measures. During the 2019 Democratic Progressive Party presidential primary, William Lai called for an anti-infiltration law to be passed. Later that year, the New Power Party was reported to be forming an anti-infiltration bill for consideration during the legislative session starting in September.

Proposal and passage
On 25 November 2019, the Democratic Progressive Party caucus formally proposed an anti-infiltration bill for legislative consideration. The anti-infiltration bill was moved to a second reading four days later. Kuomintang legislators boycotted the vote, and proposed the "" to replace the DPP's anti-infiltration bill.

Cross-caucus negotiations on the anti-infiltration bill took place in late December 2019, although only two of twelve articles were discussed, and the only agreement reached regarded the title of the act. The bill passed its third legislative reading on 31 December 2019, and became the Anti-Infiltration Act. The act passed 67–0 due to a Kuomintang boycott of the final reading, as the Democratic Progressive Party held a majority in the Ninth Legislative Yuan. Prior to its promulgation, Kuomintang and People First Party legislators petitioned the Council of Grand Justices for a ruling on the law. The Anti-infiltration Act took effect on 15 January 2020.

Proposed amendments
Legislator Kuo Kuo-wen proposed an amendment to Article 6 of the act in May 2020, linking the Anti-infiltration Act to provisions of the  covering cybersecurity, murder, intimidation and harm to others. An amendment drafted by Chiu Chih-wei in April 2022 proposed permitting the dissolution of political parties found by the Constitutional Court to have colluded with an enemy state to affect the outcome of an election in Taiwan.

Content
The Anti-Infiltration Act contains twelve articles. Foreign hostile forces are defined by the act as countries or political entities at war or engaging in a military standoff with Taiwan. The act also includes provisions on disinformation. Violations of the act are punishable by a maximum fine not to exceed NT$10 million or five years imprisonment.

Reception

Support
In addition to the Democratic Progressive Party caucus and  majority in the Ninth Legislative Yuan, support for the Anti-Infiltration Act came from former defense minister Michael Tsai.

The New Power Party offered measured support, stating that the law could be further strengthened. 

Taipei mayor Ko Wen-je supported the purpose of the bill but called for the its wording to be clearly defined and for its contents to be discussed.

The bill/law has been cited by researchers as an important means for Taiwan to combat Mainland China’s propaganda and disinformation campaigns. Prior to its passage, Sung Cheng-en of the Taiwan Democracy Watch stated that the Anti-Infiltration Act should have included regulations on political propaganda.

Opposition
Taiwanese businesses and industry organizations located in China expressed opposition to the act, as did Terry Gou.

James Soong, presidential candidate of the People First Party, was critical of the act, as were multiple high ranking Kuomintang officials, including Han Kuo-yu Ma Ying-jeou William Tseng, and Wu Den-yih.

Before the bill's passage in December 2019,  Taiwan Affairs Office spokeswoman Zhu Fenglian stated that it had "already caused alarm and panic" amongst Taiwanese businesspeople and students in China.

Effects
Tsai Ing-wen responded to criticisms of the Anti-Infiltration Act in a speech on 1 January 2020. After the act was promulgated on 15 January 2020, Tsai stressed that legal exchanges with China would not be adversely affected, and asked the Executive Yuan and Straits Exchange Foundation to clarify questions about the law.

Flags of the People's Republic of China, first flown along Mofan Street in Jincheng, Kinmen, in 2018 to welcome Chinese tourists, were voluntarily taken down days after the Anti-Infiltration Act passed its third legislative reading, as residents feared that the law made flying the PRC flag illegal.

Master Chain, a pro-Chinese government media outlet, withdrew from the Taiwan market following the passage of the Anti-Infiltration Act.

The first warrants and searches under the purview of the act were carried out during the 2022 local election cycle.

See also 
 Foreign electoral intervention
 Foreign Agents Registration Act

References

External links
text of the Anti-infiltration Act, provided by the Ministry of Justice 

2019 in Taiwan
2019 in law
Law of Taiwan
2020 in law
2020 in Taiwan